L. aromatica may refer to:
 Limnophila aromatica, a plant species
 Lycaste aromatica, a plant species

See also 
 Aromatica